Armthorpe Welfare Football Club is a semi-professional football club based in Armthorpe, South Yorkshire, England.

History
The club was established in 1926, and initially competed only in local leagues, including the Doncaster Red Triangle League. In 1935 they turned semi-professional and joined the Sheffield Association League. They first entered the FA Cup in the following season, and competed in the FA Amateur Cup for a few years after World War II. They left the Sheffield League in 1950 to join Division Two of the Doncaster & District Senior League. Their first season in the new league saw them promoted to Division One.

Although they were relegated two seasons later, Armthorpe won Division Two at the first attempt to earn promotion back to Division One. In just their second season in Division One they won the league title, and they would go on to win the title on a further four occasions in the next five years. They added further title wins in 1960–61, 1961–62 and 1964–65. However the club was relegated from the renamed Premier Division at the end of the 1966–67 season. They were relegated again in 1969–70, and sunk into Division Three after another relegation in 1972–73. In 1974 the club folded.

Two years later the club reformed and rejoined the Doncaster & District Senior League. They began in Division Three, which they won in 1978–79. The following season they won Division Two and the League Cup in 1979–80, and went on to retain the League Cup for the following two seasons. In 1981–82 they won the League Cup for a fourth consecutive season, as well as the West Riding Challenge Cup and the Division One title, earning promotion to the Premier Division. The following season saw them win four competitions; the Premier Division, the League Cup, the West Riding Challenge Cup and the Goole & Thorne FA Challenge Cup.

Following their Premier Division title, the club moved up Division Two North of the Northern Counties East League (NCEL). They finished as runners-up in their first season, earning promotion to Division One Central. They went on to win the division at the first attempt and were promoted to the Premier Division, where they have remained since, becoming the division's longest serving club. In 1987–88 the club finished as runners-up, losing the title to Emley on goal difference. In 2000–01 they finished in the relegation zone, but were reprieved from relegation after Ossett Albion were promoted to the Northern Premier League and no club was relegated in their place. Having remained in the Premier Division for a record 32 seasons, the club were relegated to Division One at the end of the 2016–17 season after finishing second-from-bottom of the table.

Season-by-season record

Ground
The club plays at the Welfare Ground on Church Street. It has a capacity of 2,500, of which 250 is seated and 400 covered.

Honours
Northern Counties East League
Division One Central champions 1984–85
Doncaster & District Senior League
Champions 1952–53, 1953–54, 1954–55, 1956–57, 1957–58, 1960–61, 1961–62, 1964–65, 1982–83
Division One champions 1981–82
Division Two champions 1978–79
Division Three champions 1977–78
League Cup winners 1979–80, 1980–81, 1981–82, 1982–83
West Riding Challenge Cup
Winners 1981–82, 1982–83
Goole & Thorne FA Challenge Cup
Winners 1982–83

Records
Highest league position: 2nd in the Northern Counties East League Premier Division, 1987–88
Best FA Cup performance: Third qualifying round, 1986–87
Best FA Amateur Cup performance: Fourth qualifying round, 1957–58
Best FA Vase performance: Fourth round, 2009–10
Record attendance: 2,000 vs Doncaster Rovers, pre-season friendly, 1985–86

See also
Armthorpe Welfare F.C. players
Armthorpe Welfare F.C. managers

References

External links

 
Football clubs in England
Football clubs in South Yorkshire
Sport in Doncaster
Association football clubs established in 1926
1926 establishments in England
Sheffield Association League
Doncaster & District Senior League
Northern Counties East Football League
Mining association football teams in England